Arthur Thomas Nickson (4 February 1902 in Liverpool, England – 5 January 1974), was a British western fiction writer as Arthur Nickson, Matt Winstan, John Saunders, Arthur Hodson and Roy Peters, from 1956 to 1968. He married the also English writer Hilda Nickson, née Hilda Pressley.

Bibliography

As Arthur Nickson

Single novels
Tin Star Sheriff	(1956)
Gold Trail	(1957)
No Star for the Deputy	(1957)
Silver Town	(1957)
Dust Was His Shroud	(1960)
Guns Blaze at Noon	(1960)
Bounty Hunter's Trail	(1961)
Lone Killer	(1961)
Arizona Gun Feud	(1962)
Gunfight at Nolan's Canyon	(1963)
Two Deputies Came Riding	(1963)
Arizona Hideout	(1964)
Gun Trail	(1964)
Range Tramp	(1965)
Ride a Crooked Trail	(1966)
Sandy Creek Rustlers	(1967)
Rope Law	(1968)

Rusty Hines Series
Rusty Hines Hits the Trail	(1958)
Rusty Hines – Trouble Shooter	(1959)

As Matt Winstan

Single novels
The Big Herd	(1957)
Gunslick Gambler	(1958)
New Trails Blaze West	(1960)
Gunsmoke On The Iron Trail	(1961)
Pay Off In Lead	(1961)
Bandit Trail	(1962)
Trail To Boot Hill	(1962)
Drive To Dodge City	(1963)
No Branding Fire	(1963)

As John Saunders

Single novels
One-Gun Justice	(1959)
Vengeance Rode West	(1959)
A Colt For The Kid	(1959)
Guns In High Summer	(1961)
The Next Stage Out	(1961)
Arizona Feud	(1962)
Gunman's Bluff	(1963)

As Arthur Hodson

Single novels
Silvercrop	(1964)

As Roy Peters

Single novels
The Shotgun Marshal	(1964)
Cattle Doctor	(1965)
Vigilante Justice	(1966)
Rail War	(1967)
Women Ain't Angels	(1967)
Alias Sam Smith	(1968)

References and sources

1902 births
1974 deaths
Western (genre) writers
20th-century British novelists